Aizanat Makhachevna Murtazaeva (born 23 September 2001 in Khunzakh, Dagestan) is a Russian right-handed épée fencer and 2021 Olympian. 

Murtazaeva competed in the 2020 Tokyo Olympic Games, where she placed fourth in individual women's épée. She won two bronze medals at the 2019 and 2021 Russian Championships.

Medal Record

World Cup

References

2001 births
Living people
Sportspeople from Moscow
Fencers at the 2020 Summer Olympics
Russian female épée fencers
Olympic fencers of Russia
World Cadets and Juniors Fencing Championships medalists
21st-century Russian women